Summit Lake is a lake in Kandiyohi County, in the U.S. state of Minnesota.

Summit Lake was named for a nearby point of high elevation on the railroad.

See also
List of lakes in Minnesota

References

Lakes of Minnesota
Lakes of Kandiyohi County, Minnesota